Storkvarvet Mountain is a mountain in Antarctica that is round in plan and has several radial spurs, standing N of Habermehl Peak at the NE end of the Muhlig-Hofmann Mountains, Queen Maud Land.

Discovery and naming
Storkvarvet Mountain was photographed from the air by the Third German Antarctic Expedition (1938–1939), led by Capt. Alfred Ritscher. Plotted from surveys and air photos by the Sixth Norwegian Antarctic Expedition (1956–60) and named Storkvarvet (the big round of logs).

See also
 List of mountains of Queen Maud Land

References

External links
 United States Geological Survey, Geographic Names Information System (GNIS)
 Scientific Committee on Antarctic Research (SCAR)

Mountains of Queen Maud Land
Princess Astrid Coast